The Thirst are an English indie rock band based in Brixton, London. The band consists of brothers Mensah (vocals/guitar) and Kwame Hart (bass), Mark Lenihan (guitar) and Marcus Harris (drums/backing vocals).

History
Mensah received an electric guitar from his parents around the age of 14, and after a few years he decided to get his brother, Kwame, a bass guitar, buying it from 'cash converters'. This inspired friends Mark and Marcus to complete the band by purchasing a second guitar and drum kit respectively. The main inspiration behind starting the band was their strong musical upbringing and appreciation as well as the need to stay away from the life of street crime in London. "I [Mensah] started playing now and again and got these three round just smoking and trying to stay off the road. My mum allowed us all to come round her house and chill out. She’d rather that than us hanging on the corner smoking weed." Their musical influences include Jimi Hendrix, punk, drum n bass, and local hip-hop.

The Thirst's first performance consisted of hastily created songs to fill their two forty-five-minute acoustic sets. From there The Thirst continued to constantly gig all around London. Their explosive live performances, cultivated by constant gigging around London for a year, created a strong fanbase and more public awareness. Fortunately they were spotted at The Jamm in October 2006, which led to their recording contract with Ronnie Wood's new record label, Wooden Records (est. 2004).

They have performed at a number of festivals, including Isle of Wight Festival 2007, Hyde Park Calling, Electric Gardens, the Dorking Rock Festival, and Glastonbury, as well as exclusive support performances with The Rolling Stones in Montenegro July 2007, and two one-night support acts for The Sex Pistols November 2007.

While working with renowned producer, Jake Fior (The Libertines), The Thirst have released The Thirst EP (23 July 2007), the single "Ready To Move" (29 October 2007) and, finally, on 26 May 2008, they released their debut album, On the Brink, to a generally positive critical reaction.

In March 2008, they played at the SXSW festival in Texas, and were picked out by Tom Robinson as the highlight of the festival. They later performed a live session on Marc Riley's BBC 6 Music show Brain Surgery.

After performing at The Oak in Burntwood, Staffordshire on 21 November 2009, The Thirst, their manager and their sound engineer were arrested by armed police. Half a day later, all parties were released without charge and were notified that CCTV operators had flagged them under suspicion of firearms possession.  Several months after the incident, the Staffordshire police finally agreed to destroy the DNA evidence acquired in the undeserved confinement of The Thirst and crew.

At the start of 2010, The Thirst were invited to compete in a songwriting competition as representatives of England at the Festival Internacional de la Canción de Viña del Mar, in Viña del Mar, Chile.  They are to perform a cover of "Satisfaction" by The Rolling Stones in the competition and perform their own songs during the Festival between 22–27 February 2010.

Discography
Albums
On the Brink (26 May 2008)

EPs
The Thirst EP (23 July 2007)
Laugh with the Sinners EP (Dec 2011)
Cry with the Saints EP (TBD)

Singles
"Ready to Move" (29 October 2007)
"Sail Away" (28 April 2008)

References

External links
 Official Website
 The Thirst Myspace
 Official Fansite
 Official GigJunkie Page

English indie rock groups
Musical groups from London